Rohit Rajpal (born 22 January 1971) is an Indian former professional tennis player.

Rajpal played in one Davis Cup tie for India, against South Korea in 1990. He got his opportunity in a dead rubber reverse singles match, which he lost to Kim Jae-sik. In addition to his Davis Cup appearance, Rajpal was also a member of India's squad at the 1990 Asian Games in Beijing.

In 2019, he replaced Mahesh Bhupathi as India's Davis Cup captain. Previously he had served as a team selector and is the President of the Delhi Lawn Tennis Association.

See also
List of India Davis Cup team representatives

References

External links
 
 
 

1971 births
Living people
Indian male tennis players
Indian tennis coaches
Asian Games medalists in tennis
Tennis players at the 1990 Asian Games
Asian Games bronze medalists for India
Medalists at the 1990 Asian Games
Sportspeople from Kanpur
Indian sports executives and administrators